Atitara may refer to:

Atitara (plant), a genus of plants in the palm family
Atitara River